Rahul R. Vellal is a singer and musician from Bengaluru, India. He started learning Carnatic Music at the age of 4. He is known for playing concerts at several locations across India and other countries, and won prizes in multiple music competitions. 

He is learning Carnatic vocal music under renowned musicians Vidushi's Ranjani & Gayatri. He was earlier learning Carnatic vocal music from Vidushi Kalavathy Avadhoot. He is learning to play the Mridangam from Vidwan Kulur U Jayachandra Rao. He is currently training in Western Piano from the Trinity School of Music, London under the guidance of Sri Abhishek N. Apart from India, he has performed Carnatic classical concerts in 6 countries - UAE, Singapore, Nigeria, Malaysia, Hong Kong and South Africa.

Awards and accolades 
 Rahul Vellal has won the "Global Child Prodigy Awards 2020" in "Singing" Category and has also been recognized as the "Top 100 Global Child Prodigies of the World" by the GCP Awards Group.
 Shanmukhananda M S Subbulakshmi Fellowship 2018 for Carnatic Vocal, presented by Hon. Vice-President of India, Sri Venkaiah Naidu, September 2018.
 Rahul Vellal has been interviewed by various International and National online digital and print media over the years. Prominent among them are his interviews with Padma Shri Dr. Sudha Raghunathan, Indian Fine Arts Academy (San Diego, California), Sarvamangala Sabha (Abu Dhabi, UAE), Sugam Culture & Heritage Foundation (Malaysia), CMC Marghazhi (Melbourne, Australia), RTHK The Works (Hong-Kong), Deccan Herald, New Indian Express, All India Radio Bengaluru, Ananya Kalasinchana - Bengaluru, Telangana Today and various other leading printed media publications.
 RISING STAR for Carnatic Music Award from LIVING, India's premier luxury lifestyle magazine for Global Citizens, November 2018
 Rahul was felicitated by the Rotary International with the "Vocation Service Award", in recognition of his outstanding contribution in the field of Music, on 14 August 2021.
 Young Achiever 2017 Award (Carnatic Music) from Rotary International, November 2017.
 Recognised as the SAMA-ACCUREX Child Artist and presented the SAMA Child Artist Award.
 Recipient of the CCRT National Level Scholarship for Carnatic Music Vocal, awarded by the Government of India.
 Young Achiever 2019 Award (Carnatic Music) from Rotary International, 2019. 
 Received the "Aalap Appreciation Award" instituted by Kappanna Angala & presented by Former Chief Justice of India, Sri M. N. Venkatachaliah on 10-August-2019, in recognition of praiseworthy accomplishments in the field of Classical Music.
 Presented with a 5 ft 6" lamp by the Shanmukhanda Sabha, Mumbai, on 31 December 2018, after his performance, in appreciation of his command over Carnatic Music at such a young age. 
 Rahul has tuned a Saint Purandara Daasa Devarnama and sung it at the prestigious Bangalore Ganesh Utsava in Aug 2020, at the age of 13 years.

Notable performances 
 Rahul gave his first international Carnatic Music concert in Abu Dhabi, UAE, on 12 January 2018, at the Abu Dhabi Chamber of Commerce.
 He performed in Singapore on 10 February 2018, for Lahari Arts Society.
 He performed in Lagos, Nigeria, for the Indian Fine Arts Society (INFAS) in April 2018.
 He performed in Durban, South Africa for the Multi-Cultural Academy of South Africa in May 2019. He was invited by the Honorable Counsel General of India in Durban, Sri Anish Ranjan, for a special performance at the Indian Consulate in Durban.
 He also performed with legendary International musicians as part of a 35 instrument Symphony Orchestra in Hong Kong on 30 May 2019.
 He has performed Carnatic Classical Concert in Malaysia on 23 Nov 2019 hosted by Sugam Karnatica.
 Rahul has sung for the International Banner Disney's, animated movie "The Lion King" (Telugu Edition), released on 20 July 2019. He has sung a couple of songs for the cub Simba.
 Rahul has done playback for Disney's new web series (yet to be released) on Jagadguru Sri Shankaracharya.
 Rahul has performed in the prestigious show "Annamayya Paataku Pattabhishekam", telecast on SVBC channel, for the renowned music composer Sri Josyabhatla Sharma, in the August presence of Music Director M M Keeravani and Director Raghavendra Rao.
 Rahul has sung in many musical videos for the renowned music director, Kuldeep Pai from Chennai.
 He has also recorded many musical videos for another YouTube channel called "Strumm Spiritual", which have been released on all media platforms including Apple Music, Spotify, Amazon Music etc. apart from YouTube.
 In Nov 2020, Rahul has performed for the prestigious Mysore Dasara Festival at the Mysore Palace.
 He performed a Carnatic Classical Concert for Shankar Mahadevan Academy, Mysuru, in February 2019.
 He performed for a Carnatic Fusion Video for music composer Mahesh Raghvan released online in December 2018.
 He also performed Carnatic Classical concert containing only Annamayya Kirtanas for Tirumala Tirupati Devasthanams Brahmotsavam at Tirumala, in Oct 2018.
 He was interviewed by Akashvani, Bengaluru (AIR), Primary Radio Station for its Bala Gopala Programme to inspire other children. It was broadcast on 29 August 2018.
 His Baaro Krishnayya Unplugged, performed for MadRasana, was featured in BBC Asian Channel in United Kingdom on 17 August 2018.
 He sang at the much-revered Guruvayur Temple 29 July 2018 at a programme organised by the Sarvamangala Sabha.
 He performed at the Madras Music Academy, Chennai, on 3 July 2018, on the occasion of Sangeetha Kalanidhi M L Vasanthakumari Amma's 90th Birthday Celebration, organised by Padma Bhushan Dr. Sudha Raghunathan.
 He sang at the prestigious Sree Rama Seva Mandali Fort High School Grounds, in April 2018.
 He participated along with Sid Sriram in the well-attended 2018 Aikya Concert conducted by Global Adjustments Foundation at the Madras Music Academy.
 He was featured on 92.7 Big FM as a child artiste on Children's Day, 2017. His unplugged songs were played along with his interview. He also sang a jingle for 92.7 Big FM, that was played throughout Children's Day.

Competitions 
 National Level – Global Carnatician 2017 conducted online and judged by eminent panelists, August 2017.
 National Level - "Sangeet Samraat", Chennai, 2016.
 State-level CEMA Carnatic Classical Competition in Bengaluru.
 State-level "Sugama Samraat" light music contest.
 Bengaluru Gayana Samaja Music Competitions in both Purandara Daasa and Tyagaraja Compositions.
 Global Online Acharyanet Carnatic music contest.

References 

People from Bangalore
Indian child singers
21st-century Indian singers
Carnatic singers
2007 births
Living people